Hair is Falling  is a 2011 Hindi film produced by Urmila Sharma, Guddu ji and directed by Vicky Bhardwaj. The film highlights the problem of hair fall in youth. 
Tag line : A Serious Comedy

Plot 

A college boy starts suffering with the problem of hair loss but does not take it seriously, later it gets serious because his career as a model was getting affected due to lesser hair.
First half of the film is mostly about youth and college life, this is where the problem of hair fall starts. 
Second half shows tricks and techniques of growing hair and is presented very sarcastically, slowly moving towards a love plot ending it all on a positive note.

Cast
 Rajesh Bhardwaj 
 Sanjana Tiwari as Sanju
 Priyanka as Kanika Batra
 Mahender Singh Bist as Sandeep
 Manoj Pahwa as Hair Clinic Doctor
 Bharti Singh as Jogger
 Gagan Guru
 Manoj Bakshi

Music

Original Score
The Opening theme and Original Background score was composed by  Arjuna Harjai

Songs
The songs for Hair is Falling are composed by Arpan Sumit & Kamran Ahmed.

Box office 
The film was released in  India on 5 August 2011.

References

The DVD and CD of the film is launched by Junglee Home Video (Powered by The Times Group).

External links

बाल झड़ना कैसे रोके

2011 films
Films scored by Arjuna Harjai
Films shot in India
Films set in India
2010s Hindi-language films
Indian coming-of-age drama films
2010s coming-of-age drama films
2011 directorial debut films